Anisogammaridae is a family of small benthic amphipods, endemic to the northern part of the Pacific rim. The family contains the following genera:

Anisogammarus Derzhavin, 1927
Barrowgammarus Bousfield, 1979
Carineogammarus Bousfield, 1979
Eogammarus Birstein, 1933
Eurypodogammarus Hou, Morino & Li, 2005
Fuxiana Sket, 2000
Fuxigammarus Sket & Fišer, 2009
Jesogammarus Bousfield, 1979
Locustogammarus Bousfield, 1979
Ramellogammarus Bousfield, 1979
Spasskogammarus Bousfield, 1979
Spinulogammarus Tzvetkova, 1972

Further reading

References

Gammaridea
Crustacean families